Sheila Marie Evans Widnall (born July 13, 1938) is an American aerospace researcher and Institute Professor Emerita at the Massachusetts Institute of Technology (MIT). She served as United States Secretary of the Air Force from 1993 to 1997, making her the first woman to hold that post and the first woman to lead an entire branch of the United States Armed Forces in the Department of Defense. She was inducted into the National Women's Hall of Fame in 2003.

Life and career
Widnall was born and raised in Tacoma, Washington, graduating from the Aquinas Academy for Girls in 1956. She graduated from MIT with a SB in 1960, SM in 1961, and ScD in 1964, all in Aeronautics. Her master's thesis was entitled Boundary layer stability over flexible surfaces and her doctoral thesis was entitled Unsteady loads on hydrofoils including free surface effects and cavitation, both under the supervision of Marten T. Landahl.

Widnall was appointed as the Abby Rockefeller Mauzé Professor of Aeronautics and Astronautics in 1986 and joined the Engineering Systems Division, was Chair of the Faculty 1979–1981, and has served as MIT's Associate Provost from 1992–1993. In 1988 she was the President of the American Association for the Advancement of Science. She was elected to the American Academy of Arts and Sciences that same year. In 2000, Widnall was elected to the American Philosophical Society.

On July 4, 1993, in the wake of the Tailhook scandal, President Bill Clinton announced her nomination to be Secretary of the Air Force.  The Senate received her nomination July 22, 1993, and confirmed her two weeks later on August 5, 1993, 183 days after inauguration and 197 after the office became vacant.  She was the first woman to head a branch of the US military. During her tenure she handled the Kelly Flinn scandal. She was elected to the National Academy of Engineering in 1985, serving as vice-president from 1998 to 2005
and winning their Arthur M. Bueche Award in 2009.

Widnall was a member of the board of investigation into the Space Shuttle Columbia disaster.

She currently works with the Lean Advancement Initiative.  She married William Soule Widnall in June 1960.  Her husband earned a doctorate degree from MIT in aerospace engineering and headed the MIT-Draper team that developed the Apollo GN&C system.  The couple has two grown children, William and Ann Marie.

Research

Widnall's research has been focused on fluid mechanics, in particular the aerodynamics of high-speed vehicles, helicopters, aircraft wakes, and turbulence. One of her most notable works is on the elliptical instability mechanism with Raymond Pierrehumbert.

Writings
 "Science and the Atari Generation." Science (August 12, 1983): 607.
 "AAAS Presidential Lecture: Voices from the Pipeline." Science (September 30, 1988): 1740-1745.

References

Further reading
 "Widnall of MIT Is New President-elect Of AAAS." Physics Today (February 1986), p. 69.
 Biography, "Dr. Sheila E. Widnall." Office of the Secretary of the Air Force/Public Affairs, November 1993.
 Dr. Sheila E. Widnall, "<https://archive.today/20130221044842/http://www.af.mil/information/bios/bio_print.asp?bioID=7582>", July 23, 1997.
 Air Force Times, August 2, 1993, p. 4.
 Sears, William R., "Sheila E. Widnall: President-Elect of AAAS," in Association Affairs, June 6, 1986, pp. 1119–1200.
 Stone, Steve, "Air Force Secretary Salutes Female Aviators," in Norfolk Virginian-Pilot, October 10, 1993, p. B3.
 "USAF Head Approved," in Aviation Week & Space Technology, August 9, 1993, p. 26.
 Biography, Dr. Sheila E. Widnall, Office of the Secretary of the Air Force/Public Affairs, November 1993.
 Ewing, Lee, Air Force Times, Panelists Laud Widnall, Approve Her Nomination, August 2, 1993, p. 4.
 Stone, Steve, Aviation Week & Space Technology, USAF Head Approved, August 9, 1993, p. 26.
 Stone, Steve, Physics Today, Widnall of MIT Is New President-elect Of AAAS, February 1986, p. 69.
 Biography, Dr. Sheila E. Widnall, Office of the Secretary of the Air Force/Public Affairs, November 1993.
 Nature Q&A with Sheila Widnall

External links
 
 NASA biography
 CNN All Politics biography
 Women’s International Center biography
 IEEE biography
 MIT faculty page

Sheila Widnall Playlist Appearance on WMBR's Dinnertime Sampler radio show March 2, 2005

1938 births
Living people
MIT School of Engineering alumni
Members of the United States National Academy of Engineering
People from Tacoma, Washington
United States Secretaries of the Air Force
Washington (state) Democrats
American women engineers
Women in the United States Air Force
MIT School of Engineering faculty
Aeronautical engineers
American women academics
21st-century American women
Members of the American Philosophical Society